Pedassaare is a village in Haljala Parish, Lääne-Viru County, in northern Estonia, on the territory of Lahemaa National Park.

References

 

Villages in Lääne-Viru County